The 1938 Cork Junior Hurling Championship was the 41st staging of the Cork Junior Hurling Championship since its establishment by the Cork County Board.

On 5 December 1938, Brian Dillons won the championship following a 5–02 to 3–03 defeat of Cloughduv in the final at Coachford Sportsfield. It remains their only championship title.

References

Cork Junior Hurling Championship
Cork Junior Hurling Championship